The True Human Design is the fourth EP by Swedish extreme metal band Meshuggah. It was released through Nuclear Blast on 19 July 1997 in Europe and on 25 November 1997 in the United States. The EP includes an enhanced CD-ROM video track for the song "Terminal Illusions". All of the songs, except for the live recording of "Future Breed Machine", were featured on the "Reloaded" re-release of Chaosphere.

Track listing

Personnel
 Jens Kidman – vocals
 Fredrik Thordendal – lead guitar, bass, background vocals
 Mårten Hagström – rhythm guitar, background vocals
 Tomas Haake – drums, vocals on "Futile Bread Machine", spoken vocals on "Sane" (demo)
 Gustaf Hielm – bass on "Future Breed Machine" (live)

Engineering
 Jocke Skog – remix (track 3)
 Jonas Quant – remix (track 5)

References

Meshuggah albums
1997 EPs
Nuclear Blast EPs